Until may refer to

Music
Until, a 1967 album by Robin Kenyatta
Until, a 2008 album by One Little Plane

"Until", a song by Wilfred Sanderson
A version of the song "Anema e core" with English lyrics
"Until..." (Sting song), a 2001 song by Sting for the film Kate & Leopold
"Until", a song by the Bee Gees from the 1979 album Spirits Having Flown

Other uses
"DO UNTIL", a statement used in control flow construction
Until, a 2016 installation by artist Nick Cave

See also